Homotopia is an international LGBTQ+ arts festival held annually in Liverpool, England. The festival takes place in late-October and throughout November every year and features a mixture of theatre, dance, film, photography, art, cabaret and debate at numerous venues across Liverpool.

History

Homotopia was launched as a pilot project on 1 November 2004, in response to Liverpool's successful bid to become European Capital of Culture.  The festival was commissioned by the Liverpool Culture Company's Creative Communities project, and started life as a ten-day programme of film, theatre, photography, art, comedy, storytelling and heritage designed to bring together an assortment of artists. Heavily supported by Liverpool City Council, the initiative was hailed as a sign of the city's 'growing maturity' in the run up to Capital of Culture and as an opportunity for the gay and lesbian community to play a vital part in the region's rich and diverse cultural life.

The first event was attended by some 2750 people, but by the following year its visitor numbers had doubled, partly due to the high calibre of guests who had featured including prominent gay rights activist Peter Tatchell.

By 2008, the festival had showcased the largest Tom of Finland art retrospective in the UK as well as the first ever North-West Grand Vogue Ball and visitor numbers had climbed to over 12,000.  City leaders praised the celebration as a highlight of Liverpool's cultural calendar.

2009 marked a new chapter for Homotopia, when a youth visit to Poland helped to forge new international partnerships. The visit became instrumental in the development of the festival's international arts programme and burgeoning social justice work. The trip also inspired an anti-homophobia documentary and education pack, which was rolled out to 100 schools and youth centres across Liverpool, gaining notable support from out gay Hollywood actor Sir Ian McKellen.

Since 2010, in addition to offering its diverse Liverpool schedule, Homotopia's work has expanded internationally and attracted audiences at various functions in Turkey, Finland, Sweden and Russia.

In 2011, Homotopia was granted National Portfolio status by Arts Council England.

In 2018, Homotopia founder and long term Artistic Director, Gary Everett, parted ways with the organisation. Guest Curator, Cheryl Martin, led the programming of the 2018 festival.

After a period of uncertainty, the Board of Trustees appointed Char Binns as Festival Director in early 2020. Alex Ferguson was appointed as Producer to lead the organisation into a new era. The pair had previously managed the festival in a freelance capacity.

Structure and governance

Homotopia was founded in 2004 as an unincorporated association, with a small grant from Liverpool City Council. In 2012, in the same year it was included in the Arts Council England National Portfolio of organisations (NPO), it became a private limited company limited by guarantee, with charitable aims. Its main annual funders are Arts Council England and Liverpool City Council.

As of 2021, it is governed by a ten member Board of Trustees who volunteer their time to run the festival and oversee its finances.

The board members are (as of 2021):
Jess Shannon (Chair)
Daniel John Kilbride (Deputy Chair) 
Andrew Matthew Bullock 
Joan Elizabeth Burnett
James Huyton
James Lawler
Cheryl Marie Martin
Marjorie Heather Morgan
Sinéad Alannah Nunes 
Stephen Terrance Welsh

Additional staff include:

Festival Director - Char Binns
Producer - Alex Ferguson
Marketing and Development Manager - Olivia Graham

Board members do not have to identify as LGBTQIA, but must have a good understanding of the challenges faced by the community and share a 'passion for queer culture'. The board meets every two to three months in Liverpool City Centre and/or via Zoom meetings. Board members are required to maintain a minimum of 50 percent attendance at meetings. They must be willing to attend key events, launches and performances, be an advocate and ambassador for the festival and must serve for a maximum term of 4 years (2 x terms of 2 years).

Past festivals

Gallery

Global impact of the festival

Over the years, the Homotopia festival has forged links with groups and organisations around the world and its international work includes the following...

 Homotopia 2012, in association with the Finnish Consulate, developed a new human rights led project in St. Petersburg.  'Art As Social Change' chronicled the emergence of gay rights movements in the UK and Europe through photographs, testimonies and film.
 Homotopia brought its Tom of Finland exhibition to Kulturhuset, Stockholm in June 2012.
 In 2012, Homotopia launched the world's first IDAHO 50, a collaboration with 50 of Liverpool's leading companies, organisations and institutions to support action against Homophobia & Transphobia.
 In 2011, Homotopia's Tom of Finland exhibition formed part of the official programme for Turku's European Capital of Culture year.  It attracted a record audience of 90,000 to the Logomo space.
 In November 2011, Tranny Hotel was held in Liverpool as part of the European-wide transgender arts festival.  The city was one of only 11 cities in Europe to hold the event.
 In December 2010, Homotopia produced a series of interventions, debates and research culminating with the Pansy Project in Istanbul, Turkey as part of its European Capital of Culture year.  Hundreds of pansies were planted to symbolize the ongoing international struggle for LGBT rights and equality.
 In 2009, 12 young people from Homotopia's Project Triangle went to Auschwitz and Warsaw to learn about the Holocaust.  A group of young LGBTQ people from Poland's KPH travelled to Liverpool to learn from Merseyside Police, Merseyside Fire and Rescue Service and Liverpool City Council.  The visit inspired a training programme for Polish police.

References

External links 
 Official Homotopia website
 Homotopia's queer TV station

LGBT culture in Liverpool
LGBT events in England
Festivals in Liverpool
LGBT organisations in England
Annual events in England
LGBT festivals in the United Kingdom